Nigel Thompson (born 29 May 1967), better known as Jumpin Jack Frost, is a British jungle and drum and bass DJ and record producer.

Biography
Frost was born in Brixton, London, and after a troubled youth, started to discover music through local sound system 'dances' and then nights such as Soul II Soul at the Africa Centre. He first started DJing at 18, playing funk and hip hop before the acid house scene arrived and he played at the Carwash nights in the late 1980s with Grooverider, Bryan Gee, and Fabio. As a resident at The Fridge in Brixton, he played alongside Paul 'Trouble' Anderson and Evil Eddie Richards. He also hosted a show on the Brixton-based pirate radio station Passion FM which later became Lightning FM. From here, he would DJ at all the large raves up and down the country including Dreamscape, Telepathy, The Edge, and One Nation.

His friendship with Bryan Gee would lead to both forming the celebrated drum and bass label V Recordings in 1993, and signing artists such as Roni Size, DJ Die, and Krust. In 1994, Frost would produce one of the jungle scenes most seminal anthems in Burial, under the alias of Leviticus, released on the V Recordings sub-label Philly Blunt. The track was later picked up by FFRR and upon its wider release in March 1995, debuted at No. 6 in the UK Dance Single Chart and peaked at No. 66 in the UK Singles Chart.

During this time, Frost would also host a show on Kiss 100 which continued until 2001. He would plays some regular guest slots on Centreforce around 2007-2009. Frost returned to radio in 2012 co-hosting the drum and bass show on Mi-Soul alongside DJ Bailey. 

Through writing his autobiography published in 2017, Frost has in the last few years increasingly spoken up about mental health issues.

Discography

Singles & EPs
Jumping Jack Frost EP (F Project, 1993)
Underworld (Osmosis/Pornography) EP (Formation Records, 1994)
Burial (as Leviticus) (Philly Blunt//FFRR, 1994)

Mix compilations
DJ Randall & Jumping Jack Frost - MixMag Live 15 (MixMag, 1994)
Big, Bad and Heavy Part Three (Chronic, 2012)

References

External links
 Official website
 Jumping Jack Frost at Discogs

Further reading
 Frost (with Woods, Andrew), Big, Bad and Heavy, Music Mondays, 2017
 

Living people
1967 births
English drum and bass musicians
English record producers
DJs from London
People from Brixton